Oswald Asher (21 May 1891 – 16 July 1970) was an Australian cricketer. He played fourteen first-class matches for New South Wales between 1919/20 and 1925/26.

See also
 List of New South Wales representative cricketers

References

External links
 

1891 births
1970 deaths
Australian cricketers
New South Wales cricketers
Cricketers from Sydney